Vanilla is a flavoring.

Vanilla may also refer to:

Botany and biology
 Vanilla extract, a solution containing the flavor compound vanillin as the primary ingredient
 Vanilla (genus), a genus of orchids
 Vanilla planifolia, the species which is the primary source of natural vanilla flavoring

Art and media
 Vanilla (band), a girl band from Barnet, London, England
 Vanilla (EP), an EP by Eiko Shimamiya
 "Vanilla" (Gackt song)
 "Vanilla" (Leah Dizon song)
 "Vanilla", a 2020 song by Holly Humberstone
 "Vanilla", a 2021 song by Lightsum
 "Vanilla", a 2022 song by Diljit Dosanjh
 Vanilla the Rabbit, a Sonic the Hedgehog character
 Vanilla Series, a brand of pornographic anime
 Vanilla, an Asterix character
Vanilla Minaduki, a character in Nekopara

Other uses
 Vanilla, Pennsylvania, a community in the United States
 Vanilla (color), a yellow color variation
 Vanilla Forums, a lightweight Internet forum package
 Plain vanilla, something standard or conventional
 Vanilla software, is a computer software which is not customized. The term comes from the traditional standard flavor of ice cream, vanilla flavor.
 Vanilla sex, sexual behavior which a culture regards as standard or conventional 
 Vanilla Air, a Japanese airline

See also

nl:Vanille